ZIF, ZiF or Zif may refer to:
 Zero insertion force, a way to connect an electrical connector without applying force to the connector
 Zero Intermediate Frequency, a radio demodulation technique
 Zeolitic imidazolate frameworks, a class of metal-organic frameworks
 Zif, Hebron, a Palestinian village in the West Bank Governorate of Hebron
 Zif, Iran, a village in Kurdistan Province, Iran
 ZiF, Center for Interdisciplinary Research, Bielefeld